Agnès Le Lannic is a female former international table tennis player from France.

Table tennis career
She won a bronze medal for France at the 1991 World Table Tennis Championships in the Corbillon Cup (women's team event) with Emmanuelle Coubat, Sandrine Derrien and Xiaoming Drechou.

See also
 List of World Table Tennis Championships medalists

References

French female table tennis players
World Table Tennis Championships medalists
20th-century French women
Year of birth missing (living people)